The 2018 CPL–U Sports Draft was the inaugural CPL–U Sports Draft, held on November 12, 2018, in Vancouver, British Columbia. Seven Canadian Premier League (CPL) teams selected 21 U Sports athletes in total. The results were announced on November 13.

Format

A blind draw was used to determine the draft order for the first round. A "snake draft" was used, with the order reversing in the second round, and then reversing back in the third and final round. Clubs have a window of time in which they must submit their pick, and failure to do so results in a pass. There is a break between each round, as well as one timeout per club. However, timeouts can not be used in back-to-back picks.

Player selection

Round 1

Round 2

Round 3

Source:

Selection statistics

Draftees by nationality

Canadian draftees by province

Draftees by university

References

2019 Canadian Premier League
2018
2018 in Canadian soccer
2018 in British Columbia
2010s in Vancouver
Soccer in British Columbia
Sport in Vancouver
Events in Vancouver
November 2018 sports events in Canada